Tamás Szeles (born 7 February 1993) is a Hungarian football player who plays for Pécs.

Club career
On 18 June 2021, Szeles moved to Diósgyőr.

On 1 September 2022, he joined Pécs.

Club statistics

Updated to games played as of 15 May 2021.

References

External links

1993 births
People from Salgótarján
Sportspeople from Nógrád County
Living people
Hungarian footballers
Association football defenders
Szombathelyi Haladás footballers
Salgótarjáni BTC footballers
Mezőkövesdi SE footballers
Diósgyőri VTK players
Pécsi MFC players
Nemzeti Bajnokság I players
Nemzeti Bajnokság II players